Frizzled-1 (Fz-1) is a protein that in humans is encoded by the FZD1 gene.

Function 

Members of the 'frizzled' gene family encode 7-transmembrane domain proteins that are receptors for Wnt signaling proteins.  The FZD1 protein contains a signal peptide, a cysteine-rich domain in the N-terminal extracellular region, 7 transmembrane domains, and a C-terminal PDZ domain-binding motif.  The FZD1 transcript is expressed in various tissues.

References

Further reading

External links 

G protein-coupled receptors